Dr Poojya Maate Mahadevi MA, B.Sc.(13 March 1946 – 14 March 2019) was an Indian Spiritual leader,  scholar, mystic, writer and first female Jagadguru,  spiritual head of the Indian Lingayat community.

Early life 
Following initiation in 1965 by Lingananda Swami, Maate Mahadevi began writing vachanas, a form of didactic poetry. In 1966 she received her Jangama initiation as an ascetic in the Lingayat order of wandering mendicants. In 1970 she was installed as a jagadguru in the Lingayat community, the first time a woman had been placed in that position. She held the 12th century woman poet Akka Mahadevi, who also wrote vachanas, as her role model.

By 1983 she had published twenty books and started an educational and religious institution called Jaganmata Akka Mahadevi Ashrama in Dharwad, Karnataka, whose focus is education and spiritual upliftment of girls and women. Among her many books is Basava Tatva Darshana, on the life and teachings of Basava, a 12th-century social reformer and philosopher who fought against the caste system.

References

Lingayatism
1946 births
2019 deaths
20th-century Hindu religious leaders
21st-century Hindu religious leaders
20th-century Hindu philosophers and theologians
21st-century Hindu philosophers and theologians
20th-century Indian women writers
20th-century Indian poets
Indian women religious leaders
Indian religious writers
Indian theologians
Writers from Karnataka
People from Dharwad
Poets from Karnataka
Women writers from Karnataka
Scholars from Karnataka
Women educators from Karnataka
Educators from Karnataka